Miloš Deletić (born 14 October 1993) is a Serbian professional footballer who plays as a right winger for Greek Super League club Volos.

Club career

Early career
Despite his young age, Deletić has managed to play in many clubs, mostly of second category. In 2016, he had a very successful season with Radnik Surdulica, a Serbian SuperLiga club, playing as a winger and attacking midfielder.

AEL
Although the player was claimed from major clubs of Serbia and Turkey, on 26 June 2016, he signed a three-year contract with AEL, thanks to the assistance of the former footballer of the club Slađan Spasić and the then technical director Thomas Kyparissis. His first season was rather disappointing as he did not manage to score in any of his 28 games. 

Deletić started the 2017–18 season as an undisputed member of the starting line-up. His first goal for the club came in a home game against Apollon Smyrnis in the late stages of the game, which ended as a 1–0 home win. Almost a month later he scored a brace in a 2–0 away win against Lamia, winning the MVP award as well. On 25 February 2018, he returned to action after a month out with injury and scored the only goal in a 1–0 home win against Platanias. On 5 May 2018, in the last game of the season he scored in a 1–1 home draw with Lamia. He made a total of 30 appearances for the season, scored 5 goals and gave 5 assists, which helped the team comfortably avoid relegation.

In the first game of the 2018–19 season, Deletić scored with a long shot in a 1–0 away win against Apollon Smyrnis. On 20 October 2018, he opened the score in a 2–1 home loss against Lamia. On 11 November 2018, he scored in a 2–0 home win against PAS Giannina.

On 22 November 2018, Deletić allegedly agreed to a three-year contract extension, with a release clause in the region of €500,000. On 9 January 2019, he opened the score in a 3–2 home win against Asteras Tripolis in the Greek Cup round of 16. On 27 January 2019, he scored the equalizer with a fine solo effort in a 1–1 away draw against Panathinaikos, to give his team an important point with ten men in the battle to avoid relegation.

AEK Athens
On 1 July 2019, AEK Athens officially announced the signing of Deletić on a three-year deal. He scored his first goal for the club away to city rivals PAOK on 29 September. Coming into the game as a second-half substitute, he converted Petros Mantalos' pass to tie the scores at 2–2.

Loan to Asteras Tripolis
On 31 January 2020, he joined Asteras Tripolis on a six-month loan.

Loan to Lamia
On 2 October 2020, he joined Lamia on loan, until the summer of 2021, as he wasn't part of Massimo Carrera's plans.

Loan to Anorthosis Famagusta
On 23 June 2021, Deletić joined Anorthosis Famagusta on loan until the end of the 2021–22 season.

Volos
On 28 June 2022 he signed for Volos.

International career
Deletić is also an international with the U-19 Team of Serbia.

Career statistics

References

External links
 

Living people
1993 births
Footballers from Belgrade
Serbian footballers
Association football forwards
Serbian SuperLiga players
Serbian First League players
Liga I players
Liga II players
Super League Greece players
Cypriot First Division players
FK Radnički Beograd players
OFK Mladenovac players
FK Vojvodina players
FK Napredak Kruševac players
LPS HD Clinceni players
FK Jagodina players
FK Radnik Surdulica players
AFC Săgeata Năvodari players
Athlitiki Enosi Larissa F.C. players
AEK Athens F.C. players
Asteras Tripolis F.C. players
PAS Lamia 1964 players
Anorthosis Famagusta F.C. players
Volos N.F.C. players
Serbian expatriate footballers
Serbian expatriate sportspeople in Romania
Expatriate footballers in Romania
Serbian expatriate sportspeople in Greece
Expatriate footballers in Greece
Serbian expatriate sportspeople in Cyprus
Expatriate footballers in Cyprus